Zelnik is a traditional pastry eaten in Bulgaria and North Macedonia. It is composed of layers of thinly-rolled leavened wheat flour dough, or possibly phyllo pastry, filled with various combinations of sirene (a white cheese), feta cheese, eggs, sorrel, browned meat, leeks and/or rice. Zelnik is often sometimes served with yoghurt and it is best eaten warm.

Zelnik is similar to börek, a dish popular in Turkey, Eastern Europe and Central Asia. Zelnik is often mistakenly referred to as börek. Unlike zelnik, cabbage börek is made for holidays and festivals and is served with kefir. The crust and the layers of börek are thicker and other spices are used. Zelnik is typically made with leek and sirene and consists of very thinly rolled layers of phyllo dough. Zelnik is usually prepared as one long, thin piece of pastry and wound up into a spiral shape.

See also
 Balkan cuisine

References

Savoury pies
Bulgarian cuisine
Turkish cuisine
Balkan cuisine